Lepiku may refer to several places in Estonia:

Lepiku, Hiiu County, village in Emmaste Parish, Hiiu County
Lepiku, Lääne-Viru County, village in Vinni Parish, Lääne County
Lepiku, Saare County, village in Muhu Parish, Saare County
Lepiku, Tartu County, village in Ülenurme Parish, Tartu County
Lepiku, Tallinn, subdistrict of Tallinn